"Wrong Baby Wrong Baby Wrong", or its shortened name when released as a single, "Wrong Baby Wrong", is a song recorded by American country music artist Martina McBride. It was written by Brad and Brett Warren (who comprise The Warren Brothers), along with Robert Ellis Orrall and Love and Theft member Stephen Barker Liles. The song was released in February 2010 as the third single from her tenth studio album, Shine, as well as her last single for RCA Nashville.

Content
"Wrong Baby Wrong Baby Wrong" is a moderate up-tempo, backed primarily by electric guitar, that features a hook where the beginning of each lyrical phrase in the verses are repeated to match the song's title. In the song, a female narrator describes telling another woman to pick herself back up after her man has walked out on her, describing that everyone experiences these moments as part of life.

Critical reception
Engine 145 reviewer Blake Boldt gave the song a thumbs-up, stating that while the song "stumbles in telling its story," it "offers the listener a blast of sass that’s sorely missing from country radio." He also favorably described the song's production as having a "bluesier edge," with a "groovy energy [that] breathes life into a slight little ditty."

Music video
The music video, which was directed by Theresa Wingert, premiered on CMT on March 18, 2010. In the video, McBride is shown driving her car to pick up her friends, who appear to be upset after their boyfriends' walked out on them, to take them out for a good time. The first woman she picks up is drinking coffee alone in a diner, the second is at a laundromat doing her laundry, and the third woman is shown staring out her apartment window. After picking up her friends, McBride takes them to a bar so that the women can enjoy themselves, while she performs the song on stage.

Chart performance
"Wrong Baby Wrong Baby Wrong" debuted at number 51 on the U.S. Billboard Hot Country Songs chart for the week of February 6, 2010. It also debuted at number 95 on the U.S. Billboard Hot 100 chart for the week of April 10, 2010. The song reached a peak of number 11 on the U.S. Billboard Hot Country Songs chart for the week of June 19, 2010.

Year-end charts

References

2010 singles
2009 songs
Martina McBride songs
Songs written by the Warren Brothers
Songs written by Robert Ellis Orrall
Song recordings produced by Dann Huff
RCA Records Nashville singles